The Leonhard Euler Gold Medal (Золотая медаль имени Леонарда Эйлера) is a medal named after the Swiss, German, and Russian mathematician Leonhard Euler, awarded by the Отделением математических наук (Branch of Mathematical Sciences of the Russian Academy of Sciences) for outstanding results in mathematics and physics. The medal was awarded once in 1957 to two scientists and since 1991 has been awarded every five years.

Laureates
 1957 — Igor Kurchatov and Felix Frankl for outstanding results in mathematics and physics
 1991 — Aleksandr Danilovich Aleksandrov for fundamental contributions to the development of mathematics
 1997 — Yury Osipov for outstanding results in mathematics and physics
 2002 — Ludvig Faddeev for outstanding results in mathematics and physics
 2007 — Valery Vasilevich Kozlov for a series of papers on nonlinear Hamiltonian systems of differential equations
 2012 —  Sergei Novikov for his deep contribution to the application of topological methods in quantum physics
 2017 — Igor Shafarevich for outstanding contributions to number theory and algebraic geometry

References

Academic awards
Leonhard Euler
Awards established in 1957
Science and technology in Russia
Science and technology awards
Russian science and technology awards
Russian Academy of Sciences
1957 establishments in Russia